Falmouth Harbour is a horseshoe-shaped bay and natural harbour on the far southern coast of the island of Antigua in Antigua and Barbuda.

It is located within Saint Paul Parish.

Geography
The small township and port of Falmouth lies close to its northern shore. English Harbour is located close to its eastern shore.

The harbour lies close to the eastern end of the Shekerley Mountains, a range of hills along Antigua's southern coast. Monk's Hill, the easternmost peak in the range, lies immediately to the north of the bay.

See also

References

Miller, D. (ed.) (2005) Caribbean Islands. (4th edition). Footscray, VIC: Lonely Planet.
Scott, C. R. (ed.) (2005) Insight guide: Caribbean (5th edition). London: Apa Publications.

Bays of Antigua and Barbuda
Saint Paul Parish, Antigua and Barbuda